Cypa uniformis is a species of moth of the family Sphingidae. It is known from China, north-western India and Borneo.

Subspecies
Cypa uniformis uniformis (China)
Cypa uniformis attenuata Inoue, 1991 (Borneo)
Cypa uniformis pallens Jordan, 1926 (north-western India)

References

Cypa
Moths described in 1922